Hugg is a surname. Notable people with the surname include:

 Dick Hugg (1928–2006), American radio personality
 Herman Hugg (1921–2013), American artist
 Mike Hugg (born 1942), English musician
 Patrick R. Hugg, American legal scholar

See also
 Hug (disambiguation)